Stav (småort) is a smaller locality in Ekerö Municipality, Stockholm County, Sweden. It has a population of 135.

References

Populated places in Ekerö Municipality
Uppland